Parmouti 12 - Coptic Calendar - Parmouti 14

The thirteenth day of the Coptic month of Parmouti, the eighth month of the Coptic year. In common years, this day corresponds to April 8, of the Julian Calendar, and April 21, of the Gregorian Calendar. This day falls in the Coptic Season of Shemu, the season of the Harvest.

Commemorations

Martyrs 

 The martyrdom of Saints Joshua and Joseph 
 The martyrdom of Saint Midius

Saints 

 The departure of Pope John XVII, the 105th Patriarch of the See of Saint Mark 
 The departure of Saint Dionisa the Deaconess

References 

Days of the Coptic calendar